The Little Slave (German: Die kleine Sklavin) is a 1928 German silent comedy film directed by Jacob Fleck and Luise Fleck and starring Grete Mosheim, Fritz Richard and Trude Hesterberg.

The film's art direction was by Erich Zander.

Cast
 Grete Mosheim as Lilli  
 Fritz Richard as Schmidt, ihr Pflegevater  
 Trude Hesterberg as Meta Strippe  
 Louis Ralph as Artisten-Franz  
 Fred Louis Lerch as Robert Hartmann  
 Walter Janssen as Richard Reimers  
 Gina Manès as Norma, seine Frau

References

Bibliography
 Alfred Krautz. International directory of cinematographers, set- and costume designers in film, Volume 4. Saur, 1984.

External links

1928 films
Films of the Weimar Republic
German silent feature films
Films directed by Jacob Fleck
Films directed by Luise Fleck
1928 comedy films
German comedy films
Films scored by Paul Dessau
German black-and-white films
Silent comedy films
1920s German films
1920s German-language films